Spark Point, also Canto Point, is a rocky point forming the northwest side of the entrance to both Discovery Bay and Galápagos Cove, and the east side of the entrance to Jambelí Cove in the northeast of Greenwich Island in the South Shetland Islands, Antarctica. The area was visited by early 19th century sealers.

The feature is named after the American sealing schooner Spark which operated out of the nearby Clothier Harbour in 1820–21.

Location
British mapping in 1935 and 1968, Argentine in 1949, Chilean in 1965, and Bulgarian in 2005 and 2009.

See also 
 Composite Antarctic Gazetteer
 List of Antarctic and sub-Antarctic islands
 List of Antarctic islands south of 60° S
 SCAR
 Territorial claims in Antarctica

Map
 L.L. Ivanov et al. Antarctica: Livingston Island and Greenwich Island, South Shetland Islands. Scale 1:100000 topographic map. Sofia: Antarctic Place-names Commission of Bulgaria, 2005.

References

External links 
 SCAR Composite Antarctic Gazetteer.

Headlands of Greenwich Island